The Syriac Catholic Apostolic Exarchate of Canada (informally Canada of the Syriacs) is a Syriac Catholic Church ecclesiastical jurisdiction or apostolic exarchate of the  Catholic Church in Canada.

It is exempt directly to the Holy See (specifically the Congregation for the Oriental Churches), and not part of any ecclesiastical province.

History 
Established on 7 January 2016 as Apostolic Exarchate of Canada, on territory split off from the Syriac Catholic Eparchy of Our Lady of Deliverance of Newark in the United States. On the same day, Antoine Nassif was appointed eparch-elect and titular bishop of Serigene. He was ordained as bishop on 23 January 2016.

Apostolic exarchs 
(Syriac Catholic Church)

 Antoine Nassif, appointed January 3, 2016

Extent 
It comprises six churches, in five local communities in Ontario and Quebec:

 in Ontario 
 Cambridge, Ontario
 Mississauga, Ontario
 Ottawa, Ontario

in Quebec 
 Laval, Quebec 
 Montreal, Quebec

References

Source and External links 
 GCatholic with incumbent bio links

Apostolic exarchates
Syriac Catholic Church
2016 establishments in Canada
Religious sees in Canada
Eastern Catholic dioceses in Canada